A One Day International (ODI) is an international cricket match between two teams, each having ODI status, as determined by the International Cricket Council. The women's variant of the game is similar to the men's version, with minor modifications to umpiring and pitch requirements. The first women's ODI was played in 1973, between England and Australia. The New Zealand women's national cricket team played their first ODI during the 1973 Women's Cricket World Cup, when they faced Trinidad and Tobago.

List of ODI cricketers
Statistics are correct as of 17 December 2022.

Notes

References

 
Lists of One Day International cricketers